Morum strombiforme is a species of sea snail, a marine gastropod mollusk in the family Harpidae, the harp snails.

Description

Distribution
From the eastern half of the Yucatán Peninsula of Mexico, eastward along the coasts of Honduras, Nicaragua, Costa Rica, and Panama, and also throughout the Greater Antilles and the Virgin Islands. Records of Morum strombiforme from Brazil are based on misidentified specimens of M. bayeri and M. berschaueri and the species does not occur within the Brazilian Province.

References

 Reeve L.A. (1841-1842). Conchologia Systematica, or complete system of conchology; in which the Lepades and conchiferous Mollusca are described and classified according to their natural organization and habits. Longman, Brown, Green, & Longman's, London. [Published in 12 parts in 2 volumes. Dates of publication of individual parts established by Petit 2007, Zootaxa 1648: 43-59]
 Dance, S.P. & G.T. Poppe, 1999 Family Harpidae. In : A Conchological Iconography (ConchBooks, ed.), 69 p
 Petuch E.J. & Berschauer D.P. (2020). A review of the genus Morum (Gastropoda: Harpidae) in the Western Atlantic, with the description of two new species from Brazil. The Festivus. 52(1): 60-69

External links
 Lee, H.G. [accessed 16 June 2009] The Genus Morum Worldwide

Harpidae
Gastropods described in 1842